Pierre Frieden (28 October 1892 – 23 February 1959) was a Luxembourg politician and writer. He was the 17th Prime Minister of Luxembourg, serving for eleven months, from 29 March 1958 until his death, on 23 February 1959. He also served as Interior Minister from 1951.

Frieden was born in 1892 in Mertert. From 1912 to 1916 he studied philosophy and literature in Luxembourg city and in Freiburg, Zürich, Geneva and Munich. From 1916 he taught secondary school philosophy, Latin and French in Esch-sur-Alzette, from 1919 until 1940 in the Lycée classique de Diekirch, the Athénée de Luxembourg and in the Cours supérieurs. 

During the German occupation of Luxembourg in World War II, from 18 September until 4 November 1942 he was interned in Hinzert concentration camp. In 1944, after the liberation of Luxembourg, he became Minister for Education, Culture and Science under Pierre Dupong. From 14 December 1945 to 15 July 1948 he was a member of the Council of State. 

He returned to his post as Minister for Education, Culture and Science in the government of Joseph Bech, who became Prime Minister after Pierre Dupong's death in 1953. He was also Minister for Families and the Interior. On 29 March 1958 he became Prime Minister. "Premier Resigns", Reuters report in Spokane (Washington) Spokesman-Review, March 27, 1958.  From the article, "Joseph Bech, 71, premier of Luxembourg, today handed in his government's resignation... Pierre Frieden, minister of education and interior, will take over the premiership."

Only a year later, in 1959, he died in Zürich. 

He was married to Madeleine Kinnen, herself a politician and government minister.

See also 
 Frieden Ministry

References 

Prime Ministers of Luxembourg
Members of the Council of State of Luxembourg
Christian Social People's Party politicians
Luxembourgian people of World War II
1892 births
1959 deaths
People from Mertert
Alumni of the Athénée de Luxembourg
Hinzert concentration camp survivors